2015 Birmingham Bowl can refer to:

 2015 Birmingham Bowl (January), played as part of the 2014–15 college football bowl season between the East Carolina Pirates and the Florida Gators
 2015 Birmingham Bowl (December), played as part of the 2015–16 college football bowl season between the Auburn Tigers and the Memphis Tigers